The Head of the Ohio, also known as HOTO, is a rowing race held on the first full weekend of October of each year on the Ohio River and Allegheny River, at Pittsburgh, Pennsylvania. The race is named the "Head" of the Ohio because it is a head race. It is the largest 2-day regatta on the Inland Rivers System, with more than 2,000 athletes rowing from over 75 universities, colleges and high schools. The regatta was the seventh-largest in both 2006 and 2007.

The last races of the Regatta are generally the most prestigious:  Championship 4s, and Championship 8s (both men and women). Championship sculling events (1x/single and 2x/double) race on Saturday afternoon. The Championship events usually include current U.S. National Team athletes.

Course
The 4100 meter course starts beside Herr's Island and finishes just down stream of the Fort Duquesne Bridge.

History
The Head of the Ohio began in 1987 with Mercy Hospital as its major sponsor but since 2006 has been coordinated solely through the Three Rivers Rowing Association.  The first race was held during five hours on Saturday September 26, 1987.

References

External links

 Head of the Ohio
 Three Rivers Rowing Association

Ohio River
Rowing competitions in the United States
Head races
Sports in Pittsburgh
Festivals in Pittsburgh
Tourist attractions in Pittsburgh